Dewathang Gewog (Dzongkha: དབེ་བ་ཐང་) is a gewog (village block) of Samdrup Jongkhar District, Bhutan. Dewathang literally means "flat area of happiness". Dewathang is significant due to historical events associated with the area during British rule in India in the late 19th and early 20th centuries. The military cantonment was strategically important for theBhutanese army to conduct operation flush out (of Indian Militant Groups such as ULFA, KLO and Bodo) in December 2003.

References 

Gewogs of Bhutan
Samdrup Jongkhar District